Bloody Oranges is a 2021 French comedy film directed by Jean-Christophe Meurisse. The film was shown out of competition at the 2021 Cannes Film Festival.

Cast
 Alexandre Steiger : Alexandre
 Christophe Paou : Stéphane Lemarchand
 Lilith Grasmug : Louise
 Olivier Saladin : Olivier
 Lorella Cravotta : Laurence
 Denis Podalydès : The Tenor of the Bar
 Blanche Gardin : The gynecologist
 Patrice Laffont : Patrice
 Guilaine Londez : Mademoiselle Mi

References

External links
 

2021 films
2021 comedy films
2020s French-language films
French comedy films
2020s French films